Richard Harrison is a Canadian poet and essayist.

His 2017 book, On Not Losing My Father's Ashes in the Flood, won the Governor General's Award for English-language poetry and the Alberta Writers Guild Stephan G. Stephansson Award for Poetry, and was shortlisted for the City of Calgary W.O. Mitchell Book Prize.

His fourth book of poetry, Big Breath of a Wish (1998), was nominated for a Governor General's Award  and won the City of Calgary Book Prize.

25, released in the fall of 2019, is a 25th anniversary release celebrating the publication of Hero of the Play. It contains new hockey poems, poems from Hero of the Play (original and revised), and commentary.

Harrison was born in Toronto in 1957 and moved to Calgary in 1995 to spend a year as the Calgary Distinguished Writers Program Canadian Writer-in-Residence at the University of Calgary. He has lived in Calgary since then. He holds degrees from Trent University (in biology and philosophy) and Concordia University (in creative writing). He has had teaching positions at Trent University, the University of Calgary, and now Mount Royal University.

He has recently completed work on several books of essays (as an editor and contributor).

Selected bibliography
 1987 Fathers Never Leave You (Mosaic Press: out of print)
 1991 Recovering the Naked Man (Wolsak & Wynn: out of print)
 1994 Hero of the Play (2004 - 10th Anniversary ed. Wolsak & Wynn) 
 1995 Big Breath of a Wish (Wolsak & Wynn)
 2005 Worthy of His Fall (Wolsak & Wynn)
 2016 On Not Losing My Father’s Ashes in the Flood (Wolsak & Wynn)
 2019 Twenty-Five: Hockey Poems New and Revised (Wolsak & Wynn)

Essay collections
Now is the Winter: Thinking about Hockey (2009 Wolsak & Wynn)
Secret Identity Reader (2010 Wolsak & Wynn)

References

External links
 Faculty profile at Mount Royal University
 Bio at Wolsak & Wynn Publishers

1957 births
Living people
20th-century Canadian poets
20th-century Canadian male writers
Canadian male poets
21st-century Canadian poets
Writers from Toronto
Trent University alumni
Academic staff of Trent University
Concordia University alumni
Writers from Calgary
Academic staff of the University of Calgary
Academic staff of Mount Royal University
Governor General's Award-winning poets
21st-century Canadian male writers